The Vajrasuchi Upanishad (IAST: Vajrasūcī Upaniṣad) is an important Sanskrit text and an Upanishad of Hinduism. It is classified as one of the 22 Samanya (general) Upanishads, and identified as a Vedanta text. It is attached to the Samaveda.

The text discusses the four varnas. It is notable for being a sustained philosophical attack against the division of human beings, and for asserting that any human being can achieve the highest spiritual state of existence.

Etymology
The Sanskrit word Vajrasuchi means "diamond pointed needle". The term Upanishad means it is knowledge text that belongs to the corpus of Vedanta literature collection presenting the philosophical concepts of Hinduism and considered the highest purpose of its scripture, the Vedas.

History
The Vajrasuchi Upanishad survives into the modern era in several versions. Manuscripts of the text were discovered and collected during the colonial times, and by early 19th-century eight copies of the manuscripts from North India and five copies from South India were known. Most versions were in Sanskrit in Devanagari script and two in Telugu language, in palm-leaf manuscript form, with some in damaged condition. There are differences in the text between these manuscripts, but the focus and central message is the same.

The date as well as the author of Vajrasuchi Upanishad is unclear. The Upanishad is attributed to Sankaracharya in the manuscripts discovered by early 1800s. Sankaracharya, also known as Adi Shankara, was an Advaita Vedanta scholar, but given the Indian tradition of dedicating and attributing texts to revered historical scholars, there is uncertainty whether texts attributed to Adi Shankara were actually composed by him or in the 8th-century he likely lived in.

This text is also sometimes titled as Vajrasucika Upanishad, Vajra suchika Upanishad, Vajrasuci Upanishad, Vajrasucy Upanishad and Vajrasucyupanishad. In the Telugu language anthology of 108 Upanishads of the Muktika canon, narrated by Rama to Hanuman, it is listed at number 36.

The Vajrasūcī of pseudo-Aśvaghoṣa 
After the discovery of palm-leaf manuscripts of the Vajrasuchi Upanishad manuscript, a Buddhist text attributed to 2nd-century CE Asvaghosa was published from Nepal with the same title Vajrasuchi, which is similar in its message as the Vajrasuchi Upanishad. It was published in 1839 by Hodgson, Wilkinson and Sūbajī Bāpū. This added to the complications in dating and in determining the author of the text. However, the authenticity of the Buddhist text, and whether its author was Asvaghosa is considered seriously doubtful, according to many scholars, and most recently by Patrick Olivelle. Schrader stated in 1908 that the Vajrasuchi attributed to Asvaghosa, "though seemingly an independent work, in fact is nothing but a Buddhist commentary on or elaboration of the first part of Vajrasucyupanisad, with many quotations from Sruti and Smriti".

Contents
The text is structured as a single chapter in a prose form. It opens with verse 1 asserting that it describes the "Vajrasuchi doctrine", which destroys ignorance, condemns those who are ignorant and exalts those with the divine knowledge. The verse 2 of the text presents a series of questions, the possible answers analyzed in verses 3 through 8, the verse 9 presents its view, and then an epilogue concludes the Upanishad.

Question on the four varnas
The text asserts, in verse 2, that there are four varnas: the Brahmin, the Kshatriya, the Vaishya and the Shudra. The Brahmin, states the text, is declared by Smriti to be chief. But what does this mean, is this social division justified by Jiva (life, soul), Deha (body), Jati (birth), Jnana (knowledge), Karma (deeds), Dharmic (virtues or performer of rites)?

Answers
The Jiva does not make anyone a Brahmana, states the text, because with rebirth the Jiva migrates from one body to another, this Jiva remains the same individuality while the body changes. Thus, it is not Jiva which can determine whether one is a Brahmana, asserts verse 3.

The Deha or body does not make anyone a Brahmana, according to the text, because every human being's body is the same, constituted of the same five elements, everyone ages, everyone dies, people from all classes show various combinations of dharma (virtue) and adharma (vice) characteristics. All color complexions similarly, asserts the text, are found is all castes and those who are outcaste. Thus, states verse 4 of the Upanishad, it is not the body which can determine whether one is a Brahmana.

Does Jati or birth make a Brahmana? It is not so states the text, because sacred books tell of great Rishi (sages) born in various castes and diverse origins, such as Vyasa from a fisherman's daughter, Kaushika from Kusa grass, Valmiki from an ant hill, Gautama from the hare's posterior, Vasistha from a celestial nymph, Jambuka from a Jackal and Agastya from a mud-based vessel. Regardless of their birth origins, they achieved greatness. Therefore, asserts verse 5 of the Upanishad, it is not the birth which can determine whether one is a Brahmana.

Jnana or knowledge too does not make a Brahmana, asserts the text. It is not so because among Kshtriyas and others, there are many who have seen the Highest Reality and Truth, and therefore Brahmin knowledge is not what makes the Brahmana.

Karma or deeds do not make a Brahmana, continues the text, because all living beings perform the same deeds, past and future embodiments are common, and everyone is impelled by past. Thus, asserts the text in verse 7, deeds do not make the Brahmana.

The text in verse 8 states that Dharmic action is not the essence of the Brahmana either. Many Kshatriyas give away gold, such virtuous actions and anyone performing religious rituals is not what makes a Brahmana.

Brahmana: the Vajrasuchi doctrine
Who indeed then is Brahmana, rhetorically repeats the verse 9 of the text. Whoever he may be, answers the Upanishad, he is the one who has directly realized his Atman (innermost self, soul). He is the one who understands that his soul is without a second, is devoid of class, is devoid of actions, is devoid of faults. He knows that the Atman is truth, is knowledge, is bliss and is eternity. He is the one who knows that the same soul in him is in everyone, is in all things, pervading within and without, something that can be felt but not reasoned. He is the one who is free from malice, who fulfills his nature, is not driven by cravings for worldly objects or desire or delusions. He is the one who lives a life untouched by spite, ostentation, pride or the need to impress others.

Epilogue
The Upanishad closes by stating that this doctrine is the opinion of the Srutis (scriptures), the Smritis, the Itihasas and the Puranas. There is no other way to attain the state of Brahmana, states Vajrasuchi Upanishad, other than meditating on the non-dual Brahman (ultimate reality and truth), with the Atman as the Satcitananda – truth-consciousness-bliss. Thus ends the Upanishad.

Buddhist Vajrasuchi and Hindu Vajrasuchi Upanishad
The relationship between the Vajrasuchi text of Buddhism and Vajrasuchi Upanishad of Hinduism has long been of interest to scholars. This interest began with Brian Houghton Hodgson – a colonial official based in Nepal who was loaned a Sanskrit text titled Vajra Suchi in 1829, by a Buddhist friend of his, whose contents turned out to be similar to the Vajrasuci Upanishad. In 1835, Hodgson published a translation. The first line of the Hodgson translation mentioned "Ashu Ghosa" and invoked "Manja Ghosa" as the Guru of the World. The details of the caste system, its antiquity and "shrewd and argumentative attack" by a Buddhist, in the words of Hodgson, gained wide interest among 19th-century scholars. The scholarship that followed, surmised that "Ashu Ghosa" is possibly the famous Buddhist scholar Asvaghosa, who lived around the 2nd century CE. It is widely known that Ashwagosh was the philosopher guide of king Kanishka.

Reception
Mariola Offredi – a professor of literature at the University of Venice, states that among all pre-colonial Sanskrit texts, the Vajrasuci Upanishad is a "sustained philosophical attack against the division of human beings into four social classes determined by birth". While many other Hindu texts such as Bhagavad Gita and Puranas question and critique varna and social divisions, adds Offredi, these discussions are at their thematic margins; only in Vajrasuci Upanishad do we find the questioning and philosophical rejection of varna to be the central message.

Ashwani Peetush – a professor of philosophy at the Wilfrid Laurier University, states the Vajrasuchi Upanishad is a significant text because it assumes and asserts that any human being can achieve the highest spiritual state of existence.

The Vajrasuchi was studied and referred to by social reformers in the 19th century, states Rosalind O'Hanlon, to assert that "the whole of human kind is of one caste", that it is character not birth that distinguishes people.

Scanned manuscripts 

 MS Cambridge, University Library, Add.1421.  URL
MS Jammu, Raghunatha Temple Library, 953gha. The upaniṣad. URL

Editions 

 Aśvaghoṣa, B. H. Hodgson, Lancelot Wilkinson, and Sūbajī Bāpū. The Wujra Soochi or Refulation [Sic] of the Arguments Upon Which the Brahmanical Institution of Caste Is Founded. 1839.  Scan at Archive.org
Translation by Hodgson: "A Disputation Respecting Caste by a Buddhist, in the Form of a Series of Propositions Supposed to Be Put by a Saiva and Refuted by the Disputant" B. H. Hodgson.  Transactions of the Royal Asiatic Society of Great Britain and Ireland, Vol. 3, No. 1 (1831), pp. 160-169 (10 pages). URL of JSTOR scan.
 Aśvaghoṣa, and William Morton. Vajra Suchi the needle of Adamant; or the original divine institution of caste. Jaffna: The Jaffna Religious Tract Society, America Mission Pr, 1851. This tr. also appeared in 1843 (Worldcat).
 Aśvaghoṣa, and Albrecht Weber. Die Vahrasuci des Asvaghosha, von A. Weber. Berlin, In Commission von F. Dummler, 1860. 205-264 p. Reprinted from the Abhandlungen der Konigl. Akademie der Wissenschaften Berlin, 1859. Scan at archive.org
 Aśvaghoṣa, and Adam White. Játibhed viveksár: or Reflection on the institution of caste. To which is appended a Marathi version of the sanscrit commentary by Manju Ghoshon the upanishad called Vajra Suchi. [Bombay]: Printed and published by Messrs. Wassudeo Babaji & Co., booksellers, 1861.
 Aśvaghoṣa. Vajrasūci = the Needle of the adamant or the original divine institution of Caste, examined and refuted. Mangalore: Basel Mission Book & Tract Depository, 1869.
 Aśvaghoṣa, and Ramayan Prasad Dwivedi (ed. and comm.), Mahākavi-aśvaghoṣakṛta vajra-sūcī: samānoddharaṇa-pāṭhabhedasahita-saṭippaṇa-'Maṇimayī'-hindīvyākhyopetā bauddha-darśana-granthaḥ = Vajrasūcī of Aśvaghoṣa : A small tract of Buddhist philosophy : Edited with Hindi translation, parallel passages and a critical introduction with exhaustive appendices. Varanasi: Chaukhamba Amarabharati Prakashan, 1985. Scan at Archive.org.
 Aśvaghoṣa, and Sujitkumar Mukhopadhyaya. The Vajrasuci of Asvaghosa: Sanskrit Text. Santiniketan: Sino-Indian Cultural Society, 1950. Scan at archive.org.
Kagawa, Takao. 1958. "The Comparative Study on Some Texts of Vajrasuci". Journal of Indian and Buddhist Studies  (I Bukkyogaku Kenkyu). 6, no. 1: 134–135. DOI https://doi.org/10.4259/ibk.6.134
Ācārya Aśvaghoṣa kṛta Vajrasūcī Upaniṣada ... anuvādaka Bhante Ga. Prajñānanda. Dillī, Gautama Book Centre, 1990. Scan at archive.org

See also
Isha Upanishad
Jabala Upanishad
Maha Upanishad
Nirvana Upanishad

Notes

References

Bibliography

 

Upanishads